Kay Noel "Katie" Abrahamson-Henderson (born December 23, 1966) is the current head coach of the University of Georgia's women's basketball team.

Early years
Abrahamson-Henderson attended Washington High School in Cedar Rapids, Iowa, graduating in 1985. She was a basketball player, averaging 44 points per game  and earning a place (1992) in the Washington Warriors Hall of Fame. She was named an All-American on both the Parade and USA Today teams, and ranked as one of the top five basketball players in the nation as a senior. She was also on the swim team, and considered attending college as a swimmer, but instead chose to focus on basketball. While in high school, she competed in the Iowa State Championships and placed first in the 50 yard freestyle, the 100 yard freestyle, and the freestyle relay.

College 
Many schools recruited Katie Abrahamson; she eventually chose to attended the University of Georgia, to play for Andy Landers, now a Women's Basketball Hall of Fame coach. In her freshman year, 1986, she helped the team win the Southeastern Conference title. She played one more year at Georgia, but then chose to transfer back to her home state and play at Iowa for Hall of Fame coach C. Vivian Stringer. She played for the Hawkeyes for two years, advancing to the NCAA Sweet Sixteen as a senior. Abrahamson-Henderson completed her studies at Iowa, receiving a B.S. in physical education and sports administration in 1990. After graduating from Iowa, she attended Duquesne University, where she earned an M.S. in education in 1992. She spent one year playing professional basketball in New Zealand.

Coaching career 
While playing basketball in high school and college, Abrahamson-Henderson had no interest in pursuing a coaching career, expecting instead to become a fitness trainer or run a fitness club. However, while she was at graduate school at Duquesne University, one of the assistant coaches at Iowa became the head coach at Duquesne and talked her into being a graduate assistant coach for the team.

She then went to the University of Maine to be an assistant coach for two years under Joanne McCallie. After Maine, she spent six years as an assistant coach at Iowa State under Bill Fennelly, working alongside Brenda Frese who would go on to become the head coach at Maryland. When McCallie took over the head coaching position at Michigan State, she persuaded Abrahamson-Henderson to join her as an associate head coach.

Abrahamson-Henderson took her first head coaching position at Missouri State (then Southwest Missouri State). She helped lead the team to two regular-season championships in the Missouri Valley Conference as well as three postseason conference championships. The team made three appearances in the NCAA tournament and won the WNIT in 2005. Following the 2007 season she unexpectedly resigned, and went on to accept an assistant coaching position at the University of Washington. After a single year at Washington,  Indiana's head coach Felisha Legette-Jack hired her as the associate head coach.

In 2010, the University of Albany persuaded Abrahamson-Henderson to become its head coach; she remained for six years. Albany had a losing record in each of the five prior years, but Abrahamson-Henderson improved the team to 16–14 in her first year. In her second year, the team improved to finish second in the America East conference and earn a trip to the NCAA tournament. They finished first or tied for first in the conference each of the next four years, winning the conference tournament championship and an invitation to the NCAAs every year. In 2016 NCAAs, they upset fifth-seeded Florida, 61–59.

In 2016, the University of Central Florida persuaded Abrahamson-Henderson to become its new head coach. Similar to Albany, UCF had 5 consecutive losing seasons prior to Coach Abe's hiring, including a 7-23 record in 2015-16. Coach Abe would improve her squad instantly: a 21-12 record her first year, with a second round appearance in the WNIT. By her third year in 2018-19, UCF would go 26-7 and finish second place in the conference, earning their first NCAA Tournament bid since the 2010-11 season. In the 2021-22 season, Coach Abe would lead the Knights to their first regular season championship since 2004-05, and their first tournament championship since 2010-11 with a 53-45 victory over USF. That season, UCF would be ranked in both polls for the first time in school history.

On March 26, 2022, she was announced as the third head coach in program history at The University of Georgia.

Head coaching record

References

External links 
 Official Site

1966 births
Living people
Albany Great Danes women's basketball coaches
American women's basketball coaches
Basketball coaches from Iowa
Basketball players from Iowa
Duquesne Dukes women's basketball coaches
Georgia Lady Bulldogs basketball players
Indiana Hoosiers women's basketball coaches
Iowa Hawkeyes women's basketball players
Maine Black Bears women's basketball coaches
Michigan State Spartans women's basketball coaches
Missouri State Lady Bears basketball coaches
Sportspeople from Cedar Rapids, Iowa
UCF Knights women's basketball coaches
Washington Huskies women's basketball coaches